Gracenote is a Filipino electropop rock band currently composed of Eunice Jorge (vocals, keyboards, violin), Jazz Jorge (bass), EJ Pichay (drums) and Tatsi Jamnague (guitars). They are known for their cover of Stevie B's "When I Dream About You". The single "Minsan Lang Naman" brought them success in the mainstream. They participated in Coke Studio Season 1 with Raymond "Abra" Abracosa, making the song "Stargazer" and covering Abracosa's "Ilusyon".

History
Members of Gracenote met at St. Scholastica's College Manila. As with many bands, they started with small gigs. They entered a number of band competitions, and were named first runner-up at the Sing for Cancer Battle of the Bands 2008, finalist in Nescafe Soundskool 2008, and Grand Champion in DZUP: College Collision 2009.

In 2009 the band's bass player Rico Cristobal left and was replaced by Jazz Jorge.

Their 8-track album First Movement, produced by 6cyclemind’s Rye Sarmiento, with carrier single “Minsan Lang Naman”, highlights the band’s heartfelt lyrics and melody. First Movement “Minsan Lang Naman” has entered several music channels and radio programs’ hit charts. Their current album “Transparent” featured a sound which they categorized as electro-pop-rock. It features “I Will Wait”, “Two Four” and “Taciturn” as singles.

They were part of the lineup of Coke Studio PH and worked with rapper and flip-top artist Abra to produce “Stargazer” with their Coke Studio episode, reaching 2.5 million views. The band also collaborated with Chito Miranda, vocalist of Parokya ni Edgar, through the song “Bakit Ganyan Ka?.” The song reached more than 800,000 views in less than 24 hours and 28,000 shares on Facebook. It has gone viral on Spotify’s Philippines Viral 50 (reached no. 3 spot). “When In Manila” blog site calls it the newest original Philippine music love anthem.

In 2010, they performed at ABS-CBN's Music Uplate Live, and later released an 8-track album entitled First Movement under the management of Soupstar Entertainment. The single "Pwede Ako" topped the Pinoy MYX Countdown.

In 2013 Gracenote performed at the Converse Sneaker Clash.

Influences 
The band's influences include American rock bands such as Paramore, Yellowcard, No Doubt, Sum 41, Switchfoot, Underoath and Taking Back Sunday and Stevie B, as well as Filipino bands APO Hiking Society and Eraserheads. The band also cited Hillsong United as an influence.

Members
 Eunice Jorge - lead vocals, keyboards, synthesizers, violin, rhythm guitar, ukulele, additional drums, percussion (2008–present)
 Jazz Jorge - bass guitar (2009–present); co-lead and backing vocals (2015–present); synthesizers (2017-present)
 EJ Pichay - drums, percussion (2009–present)
 Andrew John "Tatsi" Jamnague - lead and rhythm guitar (2017–present, touring/session 2015–2017)

Former members
 Chen Pangan - lead and rhythm guitar, co-lead and backing vocals (2008-2015)
 Alvin Ortiz - guitar (2008-2009)
 Rico Cristobal - bass guitar (2008-2009)

Discography

EP

Singles

Studio album

* Eunice Jorge also collaborated with Kean Cipriano of Callalily for a special project under Universal Records: Kean and Eunice: A Trip Down Memory Lane.
* Gracenote also interpreted the song entitled "Yun Tayo" Composed by Donna Onilongo for Philpop 2018 and won the Live Smart People's Choice Award.

Awards

Notable performances 
 May 1, 2012 - front act for Secondhand Serenade
 August 16, 2012 - front act for Nelly Furtado
 October 16, 2014 - Kean & Eunice: Happy Together at The Music Museum

References

External links 
Gracenote's fan page
Gracenote's Youtube channel
Gracenote's Myx artist profile

Filipino rock music groups
Musical groups established in 2009